The 7.30 Report is an Australian week-nightly television current affairs program, which was shown on ABC1 and ABC News 24 at  from 1986 to 2011. In 2011, it evolved into 7.30, a revamped current affairs program.

History
The 7.30 Report began on 28 January 1986, screening Tuesday to Friday evenings. The program extended to Mondays the following year.

Until the end of 1994 the program had separate editions for each state and territory, presented by Alan Carpenter, Mary Delahunty, Quentin Dempster, Trisha Goddard, Sarah Henderson, Genevieve Hussey, John Jost, Leigh McClusky, Kelly Nestor, and Andrew Olle. Kerry O'Brien took over as the presenter of the national program in 1995, with Maxine McKew serving as the main relief presenter until 2006.

O'Brien remained the editor and presenter of the program from the time it went national. He announced in 2010 that he would be leaving at the end of the year. He presented his final edition of the program on 9 December 2010.

In February 1996, the Friday episode of the show was replaced with Stateline, a similar show with a separate edition for each state and territory.

2011 changes 

The ABC announced in December 2010 that the program would return in 2011 in a new form, under the name 7.30. The revamped program was first presented by Leigh Sales from Sydney. Chris Uhlmann was 7.30's first political editor and Canberra presenter.

The ABC also announced that Stateline would be folded into the 7.30 program. The change saw 7.30 extended to five nights a week, although Friday editions continued to be presented locally and focus on state affairs.

Format
The program usually comprised several pre-recorded items and live interviews, focusing on issues of national or global significance. The program traditionally featured interviews with politicians.

Reporters in its last season included: Tracy Bowden, Matt Peacock, Andy Park, Sean Rubinsztein-Dunlop, Dylan Welch, Louise Milligan, Madeleine Morris, Conor Duffy, Sarah Whyte, David Lewis, Monique Schafter, Alex Mann, Michael Atkin, and political editor Sabra Lane.

Former reporters had included political editor Heather Ewart, Deborah Cornwall, Greg Hoy, Mark Willacy, Michael Brissenden, Murray McLaughlin, Mary Gearin, Mike Sexton, John Taylor, Peter McCutcheon, Paul Lockyer, Lisa Whitehead, Natasha Johnson, David Mark, Genevieve Hussey, Mark Bannerman and Jonathan Harley. Paul Lyneham also hosted The 7.30 Report for several years.

Until 2010, satirists John Clarke and Bryan Dawe presented a (usually) weekly mock interview covering a topical issue. Dawe played the interviewer, while Clarke played a prominent public figure but, unusually for satire, he deliberately made no attempt to imitate the appearance, voice, or mannerisms of the person he portrayed. When portraying Julia Gillard he placed a flower pot behind him to give the impression of him being a woman. These interviews were a continuation of the pair's work for A Current Affair, beginning in 1989, for which they won a number of awards.

See also
 List of Australian television series
 List of Australian Broadcasting Corporation programs

References

External links
Official site
The 7.30 Report at the National Film and Sound Archive

Australian Broadcasting Corporation original programming
1986 Australian television series debuts
2011 Australian television series endings
1990s Australian television series
2000s Australian television series
ABC News and Current Affairs
Australian non-fiction television series